Carpathian Ukraine may refer to:

 in terms of geography, western section of Ukraine that includes several regions on both sides of the Ukrainian Carpathians
 Trans-Carpathian Ukraine, designation for a Ukrainian region beyond the Carpathian Mountains, including:
 Trans-Carpathian Ukraine (1918-1919), short-lived unification project and claim of the West Ukrainian People's Republic
 Trans-Carpathian Ukraine (1938-1939), an autonomous region, and in 1939 a short-lived unrecognized republic known as "Carpathian Ukraine"
 , a short-lived transitional state formed in November 1944 with the assistance of the Soviet military administration after the expulsion of German and Hungarian occupation troops during the Second World War
 Trans-Carpathian Oblast (or Zakarpattian Oblast), an administrative unit of Ukraine, covering Ukrainian Transcarpathian region
 Cis-Carpathian Ukraine (or Prykarpattia), designation for Ukrainian regions on the eastern foothills of the Ukrainian Carpathians
 Sub-Carpathian Ukraine, general designation for Ukrainian regions under the Ukrainian Carpathians, on any side of the mountain ridge
 Coat of arms of Carpathian Ukraine, coat of arms of Ukrainian Carpathian region
 Carpathian Ukraine (economic region), one of nine economic regions of modern Ukraine

See also 
 Ukraine (disambiguation)
 Carpathia (disambiguation)
 Carpathian (disambiguation)
 Subcarpathia (disambiguation)
 Subcarpathian (disambiguation)
 Transcarpathia (disambiguation)
 Zakarpattia (disambiguation)